Mike Grossner  is an American football coach who is currently the head coach for Bethany. He was the head football coach at Baker University in Baldwin City, Kansas, a position he has held since the 2004 season until the conclusion of the 2018 season.  While head coach at Baker, Grossner led the school to both their 500th and 600th all-time program victory, building it to the #2 program in the National Association of Intercollegiate Athletics in terms of number of all-time wins.

Head coaching record

College

References

Year of birth missing (living people)
Living people
American football quarterbacks
Baker Wildcats football coaches
Bethany Swedes football players
Bethany Swedes football coaches
Glendale Gauchos football coaches
Scottsdale Fighting Artichokes football players
Western Colorado Mountaineers football coaches
High school football coaches in Arizona
People from Baldwin City, Kansas